Federal elections were held in Switzerland on 29 October 1939. The Free Democratic Party emerged as the largest party in the National Council, winning 49 of the 187 seats. Due to the outbreak of World War II, there were no elections in nine of the 25 cantons; Appenzell Ausserrhoden, Lucerne, Neuchâtel, Schwyz, Solothurn, Ticino, Valais, Vaud and Zug. In what became known as "silent elections", a total of 55 candidates were elected unopposed.

Results

National Council

By constituency

Council of the States
In several cantons the members of the Council of the States were chosen by the cantonal parliaments.

References

Switzerland
1939 in Switzerland
Federal elections in Switzerland
October 1939 events
Federal